Events from the year 1546 in India.

Events
 20 April 1546 – 11 November 1546 – Second Siege of Diu occurs.

Births

Shin Seung Min, 14 March
Sungun Woo, 18 April

Deaths

Seongheon Lee, 31 November

See also

 Timeline of Indian history